Renato Chiantoni (19 April 1906 – 24 December 1979) was an Italian actor. He appeared in 100 films between 1937 and 1978.

Born in Brescia, the son of the stage actor Amedeo, Chiantoni debuted on stage entering several drama and revue companies.  He was later active as an actor of radio dramas.  Very active in films as a character actor since the 1930s, after World War II Chiantoni also worked as a director of production and as a documentary director.

Selected filmography

 Lowered Sails (1931)
  (1937) -  (The Chancellor)
 Tonight at Eleven (1938) -  (Informer at the "Luna Bar")
  (1938) -  (Brigadier Sarcot)
  (1938) - Spilunga
 Ettore Fieramosca (1938) -  (The messenger of Graiano)
  (1938)
  (1938) - (uncredited)
  (1939) -  (The third brother)
  (1939)
  (1939) - Andrea Lori
 Guest for One Night (1939) - Truchet
  (1939)
 The Fornaretto of Venice (1939) -  (The Tailer, witness at the trial)
  (1939) -  (Tanaka the policeman) 
  (1939) -  (The distinguished gentleman with the monocle)
 Bridge of Glass (1940)
  (1940) -  (The journalist)
 The Two Mothers (1940)
  (1940)
 The Palace on the River (1940) - (The deluded writer)
  (1940)
 Captain Fracasse (1940) - Scapino
 Saint John, the Beheaded (1940) - The Defense Attorney [Script Name: Marcello]
 La Comédie du bonheur (1940) -  (Charlatan)
 The Mask of Cesare Borgia (1941) -  (A Page)
 The King's Jester (1941) -  (The third gypsy)
  (1941) - Boris
  (1941) - Gambamoscia
  (1942)
  (1942)
 The Adventures of Fra Diavolo (1942) - Sputafuoco
 Wedding Day (1942) -  (The upholsterer's lawyer) (uncredited)
  (1942) -  (A shareholder at the meeting)
  (1943) -  (The gentleman on the phone)
  (1943)
  (1943) -  (Vincenzo, a farmer) (uncredited)
  (1943) - Morlacchi
  (1944)
 L'abito nero da sposa (1945) - Bernardino
 Crime News (1947)
 The Charterhouse of Parma (1948) -  (The soldier with the anonymous letter)
  (1948)
  (1948)
 The Black Mask (1952) - Damprepois
  (1952)
  (1952)
 The Golden Coach (1952) - Capitaine Fracasse (uncredited)
  (1952)
  (1952)
  (1953)
 Puccini (1953) - Filippo Tacchi
 The Enchanting Enemy (1953)
 My Life Is Yours (1953)
  (1953)
 Crossed Swords (1954) - Spiga
 The Barefoot Contessa (1954) - Maria Vargas' Father
 Days of Love (1954) -  (Francesco, Angela's uncle)
 If You Won a Hundred Million (1954) - Roberto Greppi (segment "Il pensionato")
  (1954)
  (1955)
  (1955) - Il Cavaliere - Mimì's employer
  (1955)
 Rigoletto e la sua tragedia (1956) - The Court Poet
  (1956)
  (1956)
  (1956) - prof. Guidotti
 Song of Naples (1957) - The Radio Broadcast Manager
  (1957) - Usher
 Serenate per 16 bionde (1957) - Professor Palazzo
  (1957)
  (1957)
 Il Conte di Matera (1958) -  (Rambaldo's Henchman)
 Three Strangers in Rome (1958) - Pasquale, forester
  (1958)
  (1959) -  (actor with the Damiani company)
 I'll See You in Hell (1960) - Paco
 Robin Hood and the Pirates (1960) - Gladiacove
 Romanoff and Juliet (1961) - Joseph the Pilot
 Il carabiniere a cavallo (1961) - Dr. Chiantini (uncredited)
 Stranger in Sacramento (1965) - Deputy
  (1965) - Don Luis, Banker
 War Italian Style (1965) - Uncle Luigi
 30 Winchester per El Diablo (1965) - Mr. Randall
  (1965)
  (1966) -  (Prison Director)
 Web of Violence (1966)
 Arizona Colt (1966) - Undertaker
  (1966) - Scrubby
 The Long, the Short, the Cat (1967) -  (Doctor) (uncredited)
 La morte non conta i dollari (1967)
 Bang Bang Kid (1967) - Hotel Clerk
 Arabella (1967)
 I Want Him Dead (1968) - Duke Newton
 Trusting Is Good... Shooting Is Better (1968) - Dr. Aloisius
  (1969) -  (Inspector)
 The Secret of Santa Vittoria (1969) - Bracolini
  (1970)
 Colt in the Hand of the Devil (1970) - Peterson
 All the Colors of the Dark (1972) - Mr. Main
 Gang War in Naples (1972) - Capece's Accountant
 The Perfume of the Lady in Black (1974) - Luigi - the Porter (uncredited)
 Alla mia cara mamma nel giorno del suo compleanno (1974) -  (Anchise the servant)
  (1975)
  (1976) - Peppe
  (1977) - Malko
  (1977)
  (1977) - Journalist (segment "") / Prisoner (segment "")
 Lo chiamavano Bulldozer (1978) - Ozgur

References

External links

 
 

1906 births
1979 deaths
Italian male film actors
20th-century Italian male actors
Actors from Brescia
Italian male stage actors
Italian male radio actors